The Victorian regional leagues are the ninth level of soccer in Victoria, Australia, and the tenth nationally. The league consists of eight separate regional senior leagues and is administered by the Football Federation Victoria.

The Albury-Wodonga Football Association, which includes several clubs based in northern Victoria and southern NSW, is run by Football NSW, however since 2016 the Victorian based clubs have taken part in the Dockerty Cup & FFA Cup making some think they are now aligned with the Football Victoria.  The Western Border Soccer Association includes Portland SC from Victoria, is in affiliation with the Football Federation South Australia.

Currently there is no promotion from the Victorian Regional Leagues to Victorian State League Division 5, however clubs may apply to join.

Member Clubs
Clubs in the different districts in 2017 are as follows:

Albury Wodonga Football Association
www.AWFA.asn.au

 Albury City FC
 Albury Hotspurs SC 
 Albury United SC
 Boomers FC
 Cobram Roar FC
 Melrose FC
 Myrtleford Savoy SC
 St Pats FC 
 Twin City Wanderers FC
 Wangaratta City FC
 Wodonga Diamonds FC
 Wodonga Heart FC

Ballarat & District Soccer Association
www.BallaratSoccer.com.au

 Bacchus Marsh SC
 Ballarat City FC
 Ballarat Eureka Strikers
 Ballarat North United SC
 Ballarat SC
 Buninyong Redbacks SC
 Castlemaine Goldfields SC
 Creswick SC
 Daylesford & Hepburn United SC
 Forest Rangers SC
 Horsham & District SC
 Maryborough SC
 Sebastopol Vikings SC
 Victoria Park FC
 Warrnambool Rangers FC

Bendigo Amateur Soccer League
www.BASL.com.au

 Colts United FC
 Eaglehawk SC
 Epsom SC
 Golden City SC
 La Trobe University SC
 Moama-Echuca BR
 Spring Gully SC
 Shepparton SC
 Shepparton South SC
 Shepparton United SC
 Strathdale SC
 Tatura SC

Cobram Junior Soccer Association
www.CobramJuniorSoccer.sportingpulse.net

 "AC Milan" 
 "Arsenal"
 "Barcelona"
 "Chelsea"
 "Inter Milan"
 "Juventus"
 "LA Galaxy"
 "Liverpool"
 "Manchester United"
 "Real Madrid"

Football Federation Victoria Geelong Region
www.ffvgeelong.com.au
 Geelong Division 1

 Barwon SC
 Bell Park SC
 Corio SC
 Deakin Ducks FC
 Drysdale SC
 FC Leopold
 Geelong Rangers SC
 Surfside Waves SC
 Surf Coast FC 

 Geelong Division 2

 Armstrong United FC
 Barwon SC
 Barwon Heads SC
 Bellarine Sharks AFC
 Breakwater Eagles SC
 Corio SC
 Corio Bay SC Gold
 Deakin Ducks FC Black
 Surfside Waves SC

 Geelong Division 3

 Armstrong United FC Red
 Barwon SC
 Barwon Heads SC
 Breakwater Eagles SC
 Colac Otway Rovers AFC
 Corio SC
 Deakin Ducks FC Black
 Deakin Ducks FC Gold
 Drysdale SC
 Elcho Park Cardinals FC
 FC Leopold Reserves
 FC Leopold Development Squad
 Geelong Rangers SC
 Surf Coast SC

Gippsland Soccer League
www.gippslandsoccer.com.au

 Drouin Dragons
 Inverloch Stars
 Lang Lang United
 Leongatha Knights
 Korumburra City
 Mirboo North United
 Philip Island Breakers
 Wonthaggi United

Goulburn North East Football Association
www.gnefa.net

 Benalla Rovers SC
 Kyabram Phoenix FC
 Shepparton SC
 Shepparton South SC
 Shepparton United SC
 Tatura SC

Latrobe Valley Soccer League
Latrobe Valley Soccer League

 Churchill United
 East Gippsland United
 Falcons 2000
 Fortuna '60
 Moe United
 Monash SC
 Morwell Pegasus
 Newborough-Yallourn United
 Traralgon City
 Traralgon Olympians

 Sale United

Moama-Echuca Soccer Association
www.borderraiders.com.au

 Moama-Echuca BR

Shepparton Junior Soccer Association
www.sjsa.com.au

 Euroa
 Goulburn Valley Grammar School
 Grahamvale All Stars
 Notre Dame College
 W.P.S.C.

Football Federation Victoria Sunraysia
www.ffvsunraysia.com.au

 Irymple Knights SC
 Mildura City FC
 Mildura United SC
 Nichols Point SC
 Northern Suns FC
 Three Colours SC

Swan Hill Soccer League
www.swanhillsoccer.com

 To Be Added

South West Victorian Football Association (formerly Warrnambool & District Soccer League)
SWVFA

 Deakin Dragons (Seniors only)
 Corangamite Lions
 Hamilton Raiders
 Stawell Pioneers SC
 Warrnambool Wolves FC
 Warrnambool Rangers FC (Juniors only)

Honours list
(For a full list of season honours, see individual Leagues)

 2016 FFV Season
 2017 FFV Season
 2018 FFV Season
 2019 FFV Season
 2020 FV (soccer) Season
 2021 FV (soccer) Season

References

External links
 Football Federation Victoria Website

Soccer leagues in Victoria (Australia)